Piz la Stretta (also known as Monte Breva) is a mountain of the Livigno Alps, located on the border between Italy and Switzerland.

Access roads and normal climbing route
The most convenient starting point is the south route that begins at the Forcola pass (2315 m), which is at the border between Italy and Switzerland. From the Italian side, the pass can be reached by car from the nearby Livigno, and from the Swiss side this is the road from the Bernina pass.

From the east side, there is a route that starts at some lower point at Campacciolo di Sopra (1910 m), closer to Livigno. Another route from the Italian side is again from the road to Forcola, from Valle della Forcola. From the Swiss side, the route goes up the Val da Fain in the east direction to the Passo del Fieno where it joins the other described routes. From the Forcola pass, you will need about 3 and a half hours to the summit. This is a simple walk up, no exposed sections, see more in the links below.

References

External links
 Monte Breva – Piz la Stretta in Mountains for Everybody.
 Piz la Stretta on Hikr

Mountains of the Alps
Mountains of Graubünden
Mountains of Lombardy
Alpine three-thousanders
Italy–Switzerland border
International mountains of Europe
Mountains of Switzerland
Pontresina